Juan Manuel Carbajal Hernández (born 1 March 1964) was a Mexican politician affiliated with the PRI. He served as Deputy of the LXII Legislature of the Mexican Congress representing the Mexico state.

References

1964 births
Living people
Politicians from the State of Mexico
Members of the Chamber of Deputies (Mexico)
Institutional Revolutionary Party politicians
21st-century Mexican politicians
Deputies of the LXII Legislature of Mexico